The Space Children is a 1958 independently made American science-fiction film, produced by William Alland, directed by Jack Arnold, and starring Michel Ray, Jackie Coogan, Russell Johnson, Johnny Crawford, Johnny Washbrook and Richard Shannon. The film's special effects were handled by John P. Fulton, and the makeup was by Wally Westmore. The film was released in June 1958 as a double feature with The Colossus of New York.

The character Eadie Johnson is portrayed by actor Sandy Descher, who had previous science-fiction film experience when she played the catatonic child in Warner Bros. Them! (1954).

The movie featured on the comedy show Mystery Science Theater 3000 in 1998.

Plot
Dave and Anne Brewster, with their sons Bud and Ken, arrive at the main gate of a seaside trailer park that houses the personnel working with the military to complete the Thunderer, a huge rocket that will place an atomic device in permanent Earth orbit. Dave Brewster is a technician who works for the company that provided parts for the top-secret Thunderer project, which will allow the USA to strike back within minutes at any nation that attacks America. The orbiting atomic device can be brought down on a selected city by remote control.

Seven children from various families, who live in the trailer park and are involved with the secret project, meet on the beach and become friends. While playing together, the kids observe a strange beam of light shining down onto a rocky section of the beach about a mile away. As they watch, a small, glowing object slowly floats down amid the beam and disappears among the rocks.  As they watch the glowing object descend, Bud Brewster (Michel Ray) behaves as if he is listening to a voice only he can hear. He smiles and nods several times, showing no fear or confusion despite the strange situation.

That evening, after a community cookout involving all the parents and kids, the seven kids ask permission to take a walk on the beach. They head directly to a place among the rocks along the beach where they encounter a small, glowing, alien life form shaped somewhat like a human brain, resting on the sand. The kids' behavior clarifies that they are receiving the alien's thoughts and they all understand that Bud Brewster has been designated their leader as they perform a vital task for the glowing alien.

Bud and his brother Ken (Johnny Crawford) return to their trailer and tell their parents about the alien.  Dave Brewster becomes angry, believing that his son is lying to excuse the fact that he and Ken stayed out so late and worried their parents, but when Dave grabs Bud in a threatening way, his arm is suddenly paralyzed. Bud calmly explains that he and all kids are under the alien's protection. Confused by the situation, but convinced now that his sons are not lying, Dave accompanies six of the kids back to the alien's rocky hideout. The seventh, Tim Gamble (Johnny Washbrook), is roughly accosted by his drunken, abusive stepfather Joe (Russell Johnson). Tim breaks away and runs after the group, but Joe chases him, shouting violent threats of severe punishment.

Joe catches up with Tim and throws him to the ground, then picks up a piece of driftwood and raises it to strike him savagely. Just then, the alien, shown in its hiding place among the rocks, suddenly blazes with light. Joe is thrown backwards forcefully, saving Tim. Terrified, Joe flees the scene.

Moments later, Tim joins the other children and Dave as they arrive at the alien's lair. Acting on its instructions, which it silently conveys to Bud, Dave gently carries the alien back to the trailer. Once there, Bud explains to his parents that they must keep the alien safe until the following evening, but he does not explain why. His mother Anne (Peggy Webber) is understandably frightened for her family's safety because of the possible threat this bizarre being from space might pose.

When Tim Gamble enters his own family's trailer, he finds Joe Gamble's dead body just as an ambulance arrives. In the next trailer, Bud and Ken tell their parents that the alien killed Joe because he threatened Tim's life.

The next morning, the Brewsters discover that the alien has doubled in size, now measuring several feet across.  Dave Brewster receives a phone call from the base where the Thunderer is located, informing him that the rocket will be launched that night.   He and his wife realize that the alien's purpose on Earth is somehow connected to the launch of the Thunderer. While Dave is still on the phone, Bud and Ken are shown carrying the alien out and taking it to a cave along the beach. Dave knows he must alert the authorities, and he hurries to the base to warn them about the possible threat from the alien. When he meets with Dr. Wahrman (Raymond Bailey) and Colonel Manley (Richard Shannon), Dave's voice is suddenly paralyzed, and he passes out when he tries desperately to write a message.

During the next few hours, the children are shown quietly moving about the base, performing mysterious tasks while the alien exerts mental control over various people and objects such as sentries and locked gates to ensure that the children's secret mission is carried out.

Dr. Wahrman visits Dave Brewster in the infirmary. Now fully recovered, Dave discovers that he is able to tell Dr. Wahrman about the alien. Wahrman realizes that he, too, will be prevented from speaking to others about the alien, so the two men drive out to the cave in which the alien is now located.  The alien has grown even larger, an unearthly mass of slowly pulsating tissue, glowing with an eerie light whose brightness varies from moment to moment. Dr. Wahrman tries to communicate with the alien, hoping to learn what it is directing the children to do, but the alien remains silent. Wahrman and Brewster give up and rush back to the base just as the Thunderer is about to be launched.  They both realize that the alien will stop them from trying to interfere.

When the countdown reaches zero and the launch button is pressed, an explosion within the nose cone destroys the nuclear warhead, rendering the Thunderer useless. The children have succeeded in sabotaging the warhead. Wahrman orders the soldiers to follow him back to the cave, where they confront the seven children as they calmly stand shoulder-to-shoulder, blocking the cave's entrance.  Suddenly, the huge alien mass glides majestically out of the cave behind the children and rises up into the sky.  As the adults gaze upward to watch the alien ascend on a beam of light like the one that brought it to Earth, Dr. Wahrman asks Bud why the Thunderer was destroyed.

Bud tells the adults that his group did what other groups of children have done in several other countries; they sabotaged the rockets that would have carried dangerous nuclear devices into space, making humankind's self-destruction too easy if such devices were ever used. The aliens were concerned about humankind's welfare, so they relied on teams of loyal children all over the world to prevent humankind from making a terrible mistake.

Cast
Michel Ray as Bud Brewster
Adam Williams as Dave Brewster
Peggy Webber as Anne Brewster
Johnny Washbrook as Tim Gamble
Jackie Coogan as Hank Johnson
Richard Shannon as Lieutenant Colonel Alan Manley
Raymond Bailey as Dr. Wahrman
Sandy Descher as Eadie Johnson
Larry Pennell as Major Thomas
Peter Baldwin as Security Officer James
Ty Hardin as Sentry
Russell Johnson as Joe Gamble
David Bair as Saul Wahrman
Johnny Crawford as Ken Brewster
Eilene Janssen as Phyllis Manley
Jean Engstrom as Peg Gamble

Production
The Space Children was William Alland's first feature film with Paramount. It was loosely based on The Egg, an unpublished story by Tom Filer (involving a girl with polio) that was significantly different from the final plot of the film.

The alien brain was created by special-effects artist Ivyl Burks and used $3,300 of neon lights to create its glowing effect.

Theatrical release
The Space Children was first released in theaters on June 18, 1958, as part of a double bill with The Colossus of New York, also produced by Alland.

Home media
The Space Children was released on DVD in 2006 as part of the Lost Movie Classics Collection by RoDon Enterprises. In 2012, a combo Blu ray/DVD was released by Olive Films.

References

Bibliography

External links

 

1958 films
1950s science fiction films
American black-and-white films
American science fiction films
Alien visitations in films
Films about nuclear war and weapons
Films directed by Jack Arnold
Paramount Pictures films
1950s English-language films
1950s American films